James Reid may refer to:

Politicians

Canada
James Reid (Canadian politician) (1839–1904), member for British Columbia in the House of Commons, and member of the Senate of Canada
James Reid (New Brunswick politician) (1839–1915), member for New Brunswick in the Canadian House of Commons
James Reid (Newfoundland politician) (1921–1991), politician in Newfoundland, Canada
James Reid (Ontario politician) (1848–1926), member of the legislative assembly in Ontario, Canada
James William Reid (1859–1933), physician and political figure in Nova Scotia, Canada
James Allan Reid (1897–1978), Canadian politician

United Kingdom
James Reid, Baron Reid (1890–1975), Scottish lawyer, Conservative politician and judge
James Reid (Greenock MP) (1839–1908), British Member of Parliament for Greenock, 1900–1906
Jimmy Reid (1932–2010), Scottish trade unionist

United States
James L. Reid (fl. 1950–1985), American politician and jurist from Maine
James Randolph Reid (1750–1789), American soldier and Continental Congressman
James W. Reid (politician) (1849–1902), U.S. Representative from North Carolina
James W. Reid (mayor) (1917–1972), American politician known for being the Mayor of Raleigh, North Carolina.

Arts and entertainment
James Earl Reid (1942–2021), American sculptor
James Reid (actor) (born 1993), Filipino-Australian actor, singer, dancer and reality show contestant
James Reid (EP), 2013
James Reid (New Zealand musician) (born 1974), New Zealand musician and producer, best known as the lead singer in The Feelers

Sportspeople
James Reid (athlete) (1883-1935), British Olympic athlete
James Reid (cyclist) (born 1992), South African cross-country cyclist
James Reid (footballer, born 1879) (1879–1976), Scottish footballer
James Reid (footballer, born 1890) (1890–1938), Scottish footballer
James Reid (footballer, born 1990), English footballer
James Reid (ice hockey) (born 1990), Canadian ice hockey goaltender
James Reid (rugby) (fl. 1874–1877), Scottish rugby player
James Reid (rugby union, born 1876), Scottish rugby union player
James Reid (sport shooter) (1875–1957), British Olympic sport shooter
Jimmy Reid (footballer, born 1935) (1935–2017), Scottish footballer

Others
Sir James Reid, 1st Baronet (1849–1923), Scottish physician
James D. Reid, general superintendent of the Magnetic Telegraph Company
James R. Reid (1849–1937), Canadian-American Presbyterian minister
James Seaton Reid (1798–1851), Irish Presbyterian minister and church historian
James W. Reid (architect) (1851–1943), American architect of the Hotel del Coronado, and San Francisco Fairmont Hotel
J. S. Reid (James Smith Reid, 1849–1922), Australian newspaper owner, editor and businessman
James Smith Reid (author) (1846–1926), English author, scholar and historian
James H. Reid, American maritime pilot

See also
Jim Reid (disambiguation)
Jamie Reid (disambiguation)
James Reed (disambiguation)